Wushu was contested by both men and women at the 1990 Asian Games in Haidian Gymnasium, Beijing, China from September 29 to October 4, 1990. The wushu competition consisted of three events: Changquan, Nanquan and Taijiquan, for both genders. The changquan combined event consisted of changquan, one long weapon discipline, and one short weapon discipline. The competition attracted 96 competitors from 11 nations.

Schedule

Medalists

Men

Women

Medal table

References

External links 
 Olympic Council of Asia

 
1990 Asian Games events
1990
Asian Games
1990 Asian Games